Gornje Krečane  (Cyrillic: Горње Кречане) is a village in the municipalities of Modriča (Republika Srpska) and Gradačac, Bosnia and Herzegovina. Gornje meaning upper, there of course is a lower one too, Donje Krečane (Cyrillic: Доње Кречане) which is majority Bosniak today, but used to be majority Serb before the Yugoslav War

Demographics 
According to the 2013 census, its population was 41, all Serbs, with 38 of them living in the Modriča part and 3 in the Gradačac part.

References

Populated places in Gradačac
Populated places in Modriča